Isabelle Boulogne (born May 3, 1971 in Épernay) is a French sprint canoer who competed in the early 1990s. She was eliminated in the semifinals of K-4 500 m event at the 1992 Summer Olympics in Barcelona.

References
 Sports-Reference.com profile

1971 births
Canoeists at the 1992 Summer Olympics
French female canoeists
Living people
Olympic canoeists of France
Sportspeople from Marne (department)
People from Épernay